The men's 4 × 100 metres relay competition of the athletics events at the 2019 Pan American Games took place on the 9 of August at the 2019 Pan American Games Athletics Stadium. The defending Pan American Games champion is United States.

Summary
The semi-finals were cancelled as the race scratched down to a 9 lane final.  Brazil's first leg, Rodrigo do Nascimento blazed the turn to give them a clear lead at the first handoff while the rest of the staggers remained true.  Down the backstretch, Trinidad and Tobago's Olympic double Olympic medal relay veteran Keston Bledman and Jamaica's 2015 relay world champion Rasheed Dwyer put their teams into contention.  Cravon Gillespie ran a strong backstretch and Bryce Robinson likewise a strong turn to put USA into contention.  A strong final handoff for Brazil to 100 silver medalist Paulo André de Oliveira and Brazil was gone to take gold.  Trinidad made a smooth handoff from Akanni Hislop to Kyle Greaux and would have no challenge for silver after Jamaica's Oshane Bailey and USA's 100 gold medalist Mike Rodgers had to look back for their handoff.  Way too late to challenge Trinidad, Rodgers outran Canada's Mobolade Ajomale to take bronze.

Records
Prior to this competition, the existing world and Pan American Games records were as follows:

Schedule

Results
All times shown are in seconds.

Final
The results were as follows

References

Athletics at the 2019 Pan American Games
2019